USS Zeelandia (ID-2507) was a transport that served in the United States Navy from 1918 to 1919.

The passenger ship Zeelandia was constructed in 1910 by A. Stephens and Sons, Ltd., at Glasgow, Scotland, in the United Kingdom. She was operated in transatlantic service by the Royal Dutch Lloyd lines until March 1918, when she was chartered by the U.S. Navy.

The ship was given Id. No. 2507 and placed in commission as USS Zeelandia at New York City, on 3 April 1918.

Assigned to the Newport News Division of the Transport Force, Zeelandia carried troops across the Atlantic Ocean during the remaining months of World War I. She made five round-trip voyages to French ports between commissioning and the armistice with Germany on 11 November 1918. During those voyages, she carried a total of 8,349 passengers – mostly troops – to Europe.

Though Zeelandia claimed to have sighted and engaged German U-boats on several occasions during her wartime service, only one encounter was verified as definitely a submarine. That event occurred at dusk on 31 August 1918, when a submarine surfaced to attack the convoy in which she cruised. The attacker, however, could not press home its attack because of zigzag tactics and a moderately strong escort.

Zeelandia remained in U.S. Navy service between 11 November 1918 and 31 July 1919, making seven voyages between Europe and the United States returning American troops home after the war. During those voyages, she repatriated 15,737 American soldiers and carried 3,170 passengers to Europe.

On 31 July 1919, Zeelandia was transferred to the custody of the Commandant, 3rd Naval District for disposal. She was finally decommissioned on 6 October 1919, was struck from the Navy List the same day, and was simultaneously returned to her owner.

References

External links
Department of the Navy: Naval Historical Center: Online Library of Selected Images: U.S. Navy Ships: USS Zeelandia (ID # 2507), 1918–1919. Previously S.S. Zeelandia (Dutch Passenger Ship, 1910)

Transports of the United States Navy
World War I transports of the United States
Ships built on the River Clyde
1910 ships